Bongiovanni Vaccaro (19th century) was an Italian sculptor and ceramist.

He was born and resident in Caltagirone, Sicily. he was known for his ornamental bas-reliefs, specially on urns and for his allegorical busts. He also made five busts in terra cotta depicting: Europe; Asia; Africa; America, and Oceania. His terracotta nativity scene (presepe) composed of a few dozen figures, often painted, was displayed in 2012 at the Museo Regionale di Ceramica at Caltagirone. Another presepe is on display in Santa Maria de Betlem, Modica.

References

People from Caltagirone
Italian ceramists
19th-century Italian sculptors
Italian male sculptors
19th-century Italian male artists
Artists from Sicily